Barry Albert Wright (born 23 July 1939) is a Welsh footballer, who played as a full back in the Football League for Wrexham and Chester.

References

1939 births
Living people
Chester City F.C. players
Wrexham A.F.C. players
Bangor City F.C. players
English Football League players
Association football fullbacks
Footballers from Wrexham
Welsh footballers